Françoise d'Orléans-Longueville (5 April 1549 – 11 June 1601) was the second wife of Louis de Bourbon, Prince of Condé, a "Prince du Sang" and leader of the Huguenots during the French Wars of Religion.

Family

Her paternal grandparents were Louis d'Orléans, Duke of Longueville, Sovereign Count of Neuchâtel, Prince of Chatel-Aillon, and Princess Johanna of Baden-Hachberg, Sovereign Countess of Neuchâtel and Margravine of Rothelin, and her maternal grandparents were Charles de Rohan, Viscount of Fronsac and Jeanne de Saint-Séverin.

Françoise had an older brother, Leonor, Duke of Longueville, Duke of Estouteville, and Prince du Sang (1540–1573), who married, in 1563, Marie de Bourbon, Duchess d'Estouteville (1539–1601), by whom he had issue, including Henri I, himself later Duke of Longueville. Françoise's cousin, François III d'Orléans, Duke of Longueville was the uterine half-brother of Mary, Queen of Scots. Her maternal aunt, Claude de Rohan-Gié, was a mistress of King Francis I of France.

Infancy

Françoise was born on 5 April 1549 in Châteaudun, France. She was the only daughter of François d'Orléans, Marquis of Rothelin, and Jacqueline de Rohan. Her father had died on 25 October 1548, less than six months before her birth. From birth she was known as Mademoiselle de Longueville.

Marriage 

On 8 November 1565, in the Château de Vendôme, Françoise married Louis I de Bourbon, Prince of Condé, the youngest brother of King Antoine of Navarre and a Huguenot general. This made Francoise the sister-in-law of the powerful Jeanne d'Albret, who was queen regnant of Navarre and the spiritual leader of the Huguenots. Condé's first wife, Eléanor de Roucy de Roye, had died in 1564. Together Françoise and Louis had three sons, only one of whom lived to adulthood.

The year before their marriage, Conde's mistress, Isabelle de Limeuil, a member of Queen Mother Catherine de' Medici's notorious escadron volant ("flying squadron"), had given birth to a child which she claimed was fathered by Condé, who staunchly denied the accusation.

Widowhood

On 13 March 1569, in the Third War of Religion, Françoise's husband was slain at the Battle of Jarnac when the Huguenot army was defeated by the Catholic forces led by Marshal Gaspard de Saulx, sieur de Tavannes, and the Duke of Anjou, who would later rule as King Henry III. Queen Elizabeth I of England, herself being Protestant, promised to lend money to the Huguenot faction, however, Françoise was required to pledge her jewels as security.

As one of Jeanne d'Albret's closest confidants, Françoise attended Jeanne on her deathbed. After Jeanne's death, Françoise stated "it is a terrible loss to us".  After the night of the St. Bartholomew's Day massacre on 23 August 1572, she and her son quickly converted to Roman Catholicism to avoid persecution and possible assassination.

Françoise died in Paris on 11 June 1601 at the age of 52, and was buried at Gaillon.

Issue
Françoise and Louis had:
Charles, Count of Soissons (3 November 1566 – 1 November 1612), married Anne de Montafié (1577–1644)
Louis de Bourbon (1567–1569), died in childhood.
Benjamin de Bourbon (1569–1573), died in childhood.

Ancestry

References

Sources

1549 births
1601 deaths
Francoise
Converts to Roman Catholicism from Calvinism
Francoise
Francoise